Vergilov Rocks (Vergilov Kamak ver-'gi-lov 'ka-m&k) are a group of rocks off Bulgarian Beach on Hurd Peninsula in eastern Livingston Island in the South Shetland Islands, Antarctica, consisting of one main rock and two adjacent smaller ones submerging at high water.

The rocks are named after Zlatil Vergilov, a member of the 1988 Bulgarian party on Livingston Island, base commander at St. Kliment Ohridski in the 1996-99 seasons.

Location

Maps
 Isla Livingston: Península Hurd. Mapa topográfico de escala 1:25000. Madrid: Servicio Geográfico del Ejército, 1991. (Map reproduced on p. 16 of the linked work)
 L.L. Ivanov. St. Kliment Ohridski Base, Livingston Island. Scale 1:1000 topographic map. Sofia: Antarctic Place-names Commission of Bulgaria, 1996. (The first Bulgarian Antarctic topographic map, in Bulgarian)
 L.L. Ivanov. Livingston Island: Central-Eastern Region. Scale 1:25000 topographic map.  Sofia: Antarctic Place-names Commission of Bulgaria, 1996.
 L.L. Ivanov et al. Antarctica: Livingston Island and Greenwich Island, South Shetland Islands. Scale 1:100000 topographic map. Sofia: Antarctic Place-names Commission of Bulgaria, 2005.
 L.L. Ivanov. Antarctica: Livingston Island and Greenwich, Robert, Snow and Smith Islands. Scale 1:120000 topographic map.  Troyan: Manfred Wörner Foundation, 2009.  
 Antarctica, South Shetland Islands, Livingston Island: Bulgarian Antarctic Base. Sheets 1 and 2. Scale 1:2000 topographic map. Geodesy, Cartography and Cadastre Agency, 2016. (in Bulgarian)
 Antarctic Digital Database (ADD). Scale 1:250000 topographic map of Antarctica. Scientific Committee on Antarctic Research (SCAR). Since 1993, regularly upgraded and updated.
 L.L. Ivanov. Antarctica: Livingston Island and Smith Island. Scale 1:100000 topographic map. Manfred Wörner Foundation, 2017.

See also
 Composite Antarctic Gazetteer
 List of Antarctic islands south of 60° S
 SCAR
 Territorial claims in Antarctica
 Vergilov Ridge

Notes

References
 Vergilov Rocks. SCAR Composite Antarctic Gazetteer
 Bulgarian Antarctic Gazetteer. Antarctic Place-names Commission. (details in Bulgarian, basic data in English)
 Ivanov, L. General Geography and History of Livingston Island. In: Bulgarian Antarctic Research: A Synthesis. Eds. C. Pimpirev and N. Chipev. Sofia: St. Kliment Ohridski University Press, 2015. pp. 17–28.

External links
 Vergilov Rocks. Copernix satellite image

Rock formations of Livingston Island